Live and Remember is a 2008 Russian drama film directed by Aleksandr Proshkin.

Plot 
Andrei returns as a deserter to his native village to his wife Nastya, who is forced to hide him even from her relatives. And suddenly she finds out about her pregnancy...

Cast 
 Darya Ekamasova
 Mikhail Evlanov
 Evgeniya Glushenko
 Sergey Makovetsky
 Anna Mikhalkova
 Darya Moroz

References

External links 
 

2008 films
2000s Russian-language films
Russian drama films
2008 drama films